Phineas Parkhurst Quimby (February 16, 1802 – January 16, 1866) was an American clockmaker, mentalist and mesmerist. His work is widely recognized as foundational to the New Thought spiritual movement.

Early life
Born in the small town of Lebanon, New Hampshire, Quimby was one of seven children and the son of a blacksmith and his wife. As was customary for his social and economic class at that time, Quimby received little formal education. He later wrote that he suffered from consumption (now called tuberculosis or TB) in his youth, a disease that then had no cure, and was prescribed calomel by his doctor. The calomel was no cure, and began to rot his teeth.

Quimby began experimenting with his own ideas for a cure. He found that intense excitement (such as galloping on his horse) alleviated his pain for brief periods of time, and he became interested in the mind's ability to affect the body. He claimed to have cured himself of TB by his methods.

Mesmerism

About 1836 Charles Poyen came to Maine from France on an extended lecture tour in New England about mesmerism, also widely known as hypnotism. He was a French mesmerist who followed in the tradition of Armand-Marie-Jacques de Chastenet, Marquis of Puységur. The McClure’s magazine 1907 biographical serial of Mary Baker Eddy written by Willa Cather & Georgine Milmine started the misunderstanding that Quimby was a follower of Poyen and followed him around—which is not supported by the Quimby family or Quimby's writings. In fact, Quimby wrote about seven years later about hearing Poyen lecture: "Mesmerism was introduced into the U[nited] State[s] by M. Charles Poyen, a French gentleman, who did not appear to be highly blest with the powers of magnetising to the satisfaction of his audience in his public lectures. I had the pleasure of listening to one of his lectures, & pronounced it a humbug as a matter of course. And that his remarkable experiments, which were related, were, in my belief, equally true with witch craft—I had never been a convert to witch craft, nor had even had any personal interviews[?] with ghosts or hobgoblins & therefore considered all stories bordering on the marvelous as delusive—". Instead it appears that it was Robert H. Collyer, another practitioner of animal magnetism, who visited Belfast in 1841, who attracted Quimby's interest:

"Next came Dr Collyer, who perhaps did more to excite a spirit of enquirey throughout the community than any who have succeeded."

(Quimby's son George stated in New England Magazine, March, 1888, that "a gentleman visited Belfast, about the year 1838," but an extensive search of Belfast newspapers during that time period finds no visit by Poyen mentioned in 1838, even though Poyen was quite newsworthy. 1838 is too early for Robert Collyer. 1836 appears to be the correct year for Poyen.)

About 1842 Quimby encountered Lucius Burkmar, a local youth who was particularly susceptible to hypnosis. Finding him useful to work with, Quimby and Burkmar developed a tour of their own. Quimby demonstrated mesmeric practice with Burkmar in front of large crowds.

Later Quimby and Burkmar stopped touring. Quimby claimed to heal people of ailments which doctors could not cure. Quimby told his patients that disease was caused by false beliefs, and that the cure was in the explanation of this. Quimby published a flyer, "TO THE SICK," that was used about late 1850s to early 1860s and read as follows. It is an important statement of his beliefs:

DR. P. P. QUIMBY would respectfully announce to the citizens of [blank space to be filled in and vicinity, that he will be at the [blank space to be filled in] where he will attend to those wishing to consult him in regard to their health, and, as his practise is unlike all other medical practise, it is necessary to say that he gives no medicines and makes no outward applications, but simply sits down by the patients, tells them their feelings and what they think is their disease. If the patients admit that he tells them their feelings, &c., then his explanation is the cure; and, if he succeeds in correcting their error, he changes the fluids of the system and establishes the truth, or health. The Truth is the Cure. This mode of practise applies to all cases. If no explanation is given, no charge is made, for no effect is produced. His opinion without an explanation is useless, for it contains no knowledge, and would be like other medical opinions, worse than none. This error gives rise to all kinds of quackery, not only among regular physicians, but those whose aim is to deceive people by pretending to cure all diseases. The sick are anxious to get well, and they apply to these persons supposing them to be honest and friendly, whereas they are made to believe they are very sick and something must be done ere it is too late. Five or ten dollars is then paid, for the cure of some disease they never had, nor ever would have had but for the wrong impressions received from these quacks, or robbers, (as they might be called,) for it is the worst kind of robbery, tho' sanctioned by law. Now, if they will only look at the true secret of this description, they will find it is for their own selfish objects—to sell their medicines. Herein consists their shrewdness!—to impress patients with a wrong idea, namely—that they have some disease. This makes them nervous and creates in their minds a disease that otherwise would never have been thought of. Wherefore he says to such, never consult a quack: you not only lose your money, but your health.

He gives no opinion, therefore you lose nothing. If patients feel pain they know it, and if he describes their pain he feels it, and in his explanation lies the cure. Patients, of course, have some opinion as to what causes pain—he has none, therefore the disagreement lies not in the pain, but in the cause of the pain. He has the advantage of patients, for it is very easy to convince them that he had no pain before he sat down by them.    After this it becomes his duty to prove to them the cause of their trouble. This can only be explained to patients, for which explanation his charge is [blank space to be filled in]  dollars. If necessary to see them more than once, [blank space to be filled in]  dollars. This has been his mode of practice for the last seventeen years. For the past eight years he has given no medicines, nor made any outward applications.

There are many who pretend to practice as he does, but when a person while in "a trance," claims any power from the spirits of the departed, and recommends any kind of medicine to be taken internally or applied externally beware! believe them not, "for by their fruits ye shall know them.

Personal life
Quimby married in 1827 and had a family of four children. One of his sons, George, was a follower and strong defender of him, working to differentiate his work from that of Mary Baker Eddy, a patient who later founded Christian Science. His son owned his father's writings, which were mostly not released until the 1920s, after the son's death.

Inventor
By trade Quimby was a watch and clockmaker. He also was a daguerreoptypist, and he  invented items and held several patents for a variety of unrelated, larger mechanical devices.
(d) Phineas P. Quimby is listed as patentee for "US Patent: 8,232X: Sawing timber: Chain saw for sawing timber, wood, metal, marble, etc.", 3 June 1834. As of 21 September 2007, no records have been found for any of the patent numbers ranging from X5475 to X5497 inclusive — i.e., from 30 April 1829 to 11 June 1829).

Followers and patients

Notable followers

Among the people who claimed to be cured by Quimby were Julius Dresser and his wife Annetta Dresser, from what sickness it is unclear. Their son, Horatio Dresser, wrote extensively on Quimby's theories. He edited and collected many of Quimby's papers in his book Health and the Inner Life: An Analytical and Historical Study of Spiritual Healing and Theories (1906) (reissued as a 2009 paperback by Forgotten Books). He also edited and published selected Quimby papers in the book, The Quimby Manuscripts (1921; reprinted in 2008 paperback by Forgotten Books).

Barry Morton, a scholar of faith healing, has said that Quimby's constant practice of his mind cure method led him to make important discoveries related to curing psychosomatic illnesses. Although Quimby did not publish his findings, he trained many others in his methods. In effect, he started a "gnostic" healing tradition. Some of his methods were adopted by John Alexander Dowie, who revolutionized Christian faith healing in the 1880s.

Warren Felt Evans was a Methodist minister who was moving over to Swedenborgianism about the time that he visited Quimby twice about 1863. While he was reputed to be a student of Quimby, modern scholarship has shown that he considered himself an equal of Quimby and not a student.

Notable patients
Mary Baker Eddy, the founder of Christian Science, was a patient of Quimby's and a healer steeped in Protestant theology and science. Later, claims were made that she was at least partially inspired by Quimby in her theology. However, both Quimby's son and Christian Scientists have pointed out major differences between Quimbyism and Christian Science. Biographer Gillian Gill and others agreed, pointing out that because of its theism, Christian Science differs considerably from the teachings of Quimby, who did not base his work in religion.

Bibliography
 Quimby, Phineas Parkhurst (Seale, Ervin, ed.), (1988). The Complete Writings: Volume 1, Marina Del Rey, CA: DeVorss & Co. 
 _ (Seale, Ervin, ed.), (1988). The Complete Writings: Volume 2, Marina Del Rey, CA: DeVorss & Co. 
 _ (Seale, Ervin, ed.), (1988). The Complete Writings: Volume 3, Marina Del Rey, CA: DeVorss & Co.

See also
 Philosophy of mind
 Mind–body dualism
 Dualistic cosmology

References

Sources
 Dresser, Horatio W. (ed.) (1921). The Quimby Manuscripts Showing the Discovery of Spiritual Healing and the Origin of Christian Science,Thomas Y. Crowell Co.  
 Clark, M. A. (ed.), The Healing Wisdom of Dr. P. P. Quimby: Selected Notes from the Dresser and Collie Compilations of the Quimby Manuscripts, Frontal Lobe, (Los Altos), 1982. 
 Quimby, Phineas Parkhurst (Seale, Ervin, ed.), (1988). The Complete Writings: Volume 1, Marina Del Rey, CA: DeVorss & Co. 
 _ (Seale, Ervin, ed.), (1988). The Complete Writings: Volume 2, Marina Del Rey, CA: DeVorss & Co. 
 _ (Seale, Ervin, ed.), (1988). The Complete Writings: Volume 3, Marina Del Rey, CA: DeVorss & Co. 
 McNeil, Keith (2020). A Story Untold: A History of the Quimby-Eddy Debate. Carmel, IN: Hawthorne Publishing, 2020. Three vols. Chapter Four is a biography of the early life of Quimby, and Chapter Seven covers the rest of his life.

Further reading
 Taves, Ann, Fits, Trances, & Visions: Experiencing Religion and Explaining Experience from Wesley to James. Princeton University Press 1999 (pp 212–218)
 Albanese, C. L., "Physic and Metaphysic in Nineteenth-Century America: Medical Sectarians and Religious Healing", Church History, Vol. 55, No. 4. (Dec., 1986), pp. 489–502.
 Anon, "The Strange Life of Mary Baker Eddy; Her Ability to Gain and Hold the Loyalty of Thousands a Notable Attribute. How She Founded Her Cult; That She Rewrote the Ideas of Phineas Quimby Always Vigorously Denied -- Many Times Attacked" [Obituary], New York Times, (5 December 1910), p. 3.
 Holmes, S. W., "Phineas Parkhurst Quimby: Scientist of Transcendentalism", The New England Quarterly, Vol.17, No.3, (September 1944), pp. 356–380.
 Morton, B. "John Alexander Dowie and the Invention of Modern Faith Healing, 1882-1889", paper presented at UNISA, June 2015.
 Teahan, John F., "Warren Felt Evans and Mental Healing: Romantic Idealism and Practical Mysticism in Nineteenth-Century America", Church History, Vol.48, No.1, (March 1979), pp. 63–80.

Quimby and Eddy
A good overview of Quimby, and the incompatibility of his ideas and practice with those of Eddy, can be found in the following sources:
 Beasley, Norman. The Cross and Crown. New York: Duell, Sloan and Peace, 1952 (pp 7 & 139–149)
 Gill, Gillian. Mary Baker Eddy. Cambridge, Massachusetts: Perseus Books, 1998 (pp 131–146 & 230–233)
 Peel, Robert. Mary Baker Eddy: The Years of Discovery. Boston: Holt, Rinehart and Winston, 1966 (chapter, "Portland 1862")

External links
 The Collected Works of Dr. Phineas P. Quimby Archived December 16, 2007, at the Wayback Machine
 Phineas Parkhurst Quimby Resource Center
 A Story Untold:  A History of the Quimby-Eddy Debate (alternate source from ABCS)

1802 births
1866 deaths
19th-century Christian mystics
New Thought writers
People from Belfast, Maine
New Thought mystics
People from Lebanon, New Hampshire
American spiritual writers
19th-century American non-fiction writers
19th-century American male writers
American male non-fiction writers
Writers from Maine
Writers from New Hampshire